Fabien Verseille (born 20 November 1985 in Aix-en-Provence) is a French professional squash player. As of November 2018, he was ranked number 400 in the world and number 15 in France. He won the 2018 Prague Open professional tournament, beating fellow frenchman Christophe André in the final.

References

External links 

1985 births
Living people
French male squash players